The  is a peace museum located in the city of Asakura, Fukuoka, Japan.

Access
The museum is located near Tachiarai Station on the Amagi Railway Amagi Line, approximately 1 hour from central Fukuoka.

Aircraft on display
 Mitsubishi A6M3 Type 0
 Kyushu J7W Shinden (Replica)
 Nakajima Ki-27 (the sole surviving aircraft of this type)
 Lockheed T-33

See also
List of aerospace museums

References

External links

 

Aerospace museums in Japan
Military and war museums in Japan
Museums in Fukuoka Prefecture
Asakura, Fukuoka